Benzamidenafil or xanthoanthrafil is a synthetic drug that acts as a PDE5 inhibitor.  It has the same mechanism of action as pharmaceutical drugs used to treat erectile dysfunction, but it is not approved by any regulatory agency for such use. It has been found as an undeclared adulterant in supposedly "natural" health supplements.  In 2009, the supplement manufacturer Hi-Tech Pharmaceuticals recalled its product Stamina-Rx because it was adulterated with benzamidenafil.

References

PDE5 inhibitors
Benzamides
Nitrobenzenes
Anthranilic acids
Catechol ethers